St. Peter's Episcopal Church is a historic Carpenter Gothic style Episcopal church located at 44 Main Street in Bloomfield, Ontario County, New York. Constructed in 1871, it is a small, board and batten, Carpenter Gothic style frame building.  The 67 foot by 27 foot rectangular structure is surmounted by a sharply pitched gable roof featuring polychrome slate shingles set in a decorative diamond pattern.  A square bell tower surmounted by a pyramidal spire is attached to the front corner of the main body of the church.

It was listed on the National Register of Historic Places in 1996.

References

Churches on the National Register of Historic Places in New York (state)
Carpenter Gothic church buildings in New York (state)
Churches completed in 1871
19th-century Episcopal church buildings
Churches in Ontario County, New York
Episcopal church buildings in New York (state)
National Register of Historic Places in Ontario County, New York